Urophora conferta is a species of tephritid or fruit flies in the genus Urophora of the family Tephritidae.

Distribution
Colombia.

References

Urophora
Insects described in 1853
Diptera of South America